Qianzhou is a subdistrict and the seat of Jishou City in Hunan, China. The subdistrict is located in the south of the city, it is bordered by Fenghuang County to the west and southwest, Luxi County to the southeast and east, Donghe, Zhenxi and Majing'ao subdistricts to the north.

References

Jishou
Subdistricts of Hunan
County seats in Hunan